Regent Airways was a Bangladeshi airline owned by HG Aviation Ltd, a fully owned subsidiary of Habib Group. It is based at Hazrat Shahjalal International Airport. Due to its bad  financial condition they are looking for investors to raise funds and resume operations. But since March 2020, due to COVID-19 outbreak the airlines suspended its operation and since then it has not resumed.

History
It is headquartered at Siaam Tower in Uttara, Dhaka. It expanded its fleet with two Boeing 737-700 aircraft on a six-year lease from ILFC, and launched international flights in July 2013 – Kuala Lumpur in July, Bangkok in October, Chittagong-Kolkata flights in October, Dhaka-Kolkata flights in November, and Singapore in December. The carrier launched flights to Bangkok directly from Chittagong on 27 April 2014. In April 2016, the carrier launched flights to Muscat, its fifth international destination.

Until December 2021, the airline, due to its financial woes, and having only two aircraft at its disposal, restricted its destination to only eight cities, three being Dhaka, Chittagong and Cox's Bazar and five international routes, i.e. Doha, Kolkata, Kuala Lumpur, Muscat and Singapore.

Destinations
As of January 2018, Regent Airways serves the following three domestic and seven international destinations:
But since March 2020, due to COVID-19 outbreak all flights are suspended.

Fleet

Current fleet
As of July 2022, Regent Airways does not appear to be operating any aircraft.

Historical fleet

1 x Boeing 737-800, withdrawn from use and stored at Shahjalal International Airport
 2 x Boeing 737-700, returned to the leasing company after lease period and scrapped
 2 x Bombardier Dash 8 Q300, stored for technical and financial woes
 3 x Boeing 737-800, returned to the leasing company. S2-AIJ went to Black Rock as N705BR, was converted to an all-cargo configuration and delivered to Express Air Cargo. S2-AIH went to GECAS as N539RL. S2-AIV went to Merx Aviation as 2-SIVA

Services

Seating configuration
The Bombardier Dash-8-Q300s each had a seating arrangement for 50 passengers in an undivided single-class layout. All seats had a generous pitch of 32 inches and individual tray-tables in a four-abreast seating arrangement (except Row 1 of two seats, D & F forming a club-seating with Row 2 D & F seats) across the cabin. The Boeing 737-700s was configured in a 126 seating capacity, with 12 business class and 142 economy class seats. The economy class seats were configured with a 33-inch seat pitch, and the 12 business class seats had 45-inch reclining seats. In the 737-800s, the economy class is fitted with a 29- to 31-inch pitch; it has 159 seats with eight business class seats (Reg: S2-AIJ), and the capacity is 168 with 15 premium economy class seats (Reg: S2-AIH) with a 33-38 inch seat pitch.

In-flight amenities
On board short domestic flights, snacks such as sandwiches, roasted peanuts, mango bars, and beverages are provided. The two Bombardier Dash-8-Q300s do not have in-flight entertainment. On international flights, traditional cuisine is provided. In-flight meals are supplied by Biman Flight Catering Centre. On board the Boeing 737-700s, in-flight entertainment was provided through the Passenger Service Units (PSU) in economy class, while personal iPads were provided in business class.

On board the Boeing 737-800s, in-flight entertainment is provided through the Wi-Fi system on board. All passengers can enjoy free Wi-Fi to access a selection of songs and movies.

See also
 List of airlines of Bangladesh
 Transport in Bangladesh

Notes

References

External links

 

Airlines of Bangladesh
Airlines established in 2010
Bangladeshi companies established in 2010